Aksel Orav (19 February 1929 Alasoo – 28 October 2003) was an Estonian actor.

Selected filmography
 1959	Veealused karid (feature film; role: Tõnis Hoopkaup)
 1960	Näitleja Joller (feature film; role: Tagamaa)
 1960	Vihmas ja päikeses (feature film; role: head of militiaman)
 1965	Külmale maale (feature film; role: gendarme)
 1965	Mäeküla piimamees (feature film)
 1965	Me olime 18-aastased (feature film; role: school teacher)
 1968	Tädi Rose (feature film; role: Archie Lee)
 1969 Viimne reliikvia (feature film; role: Siim (his Estonian voice))
 1981	Kaks päeva Viktor Kingissepa elust. Part I (feature film; role: militiaman)

References

1929 births
2003 deaths
Estonian male stage actors
Estonian male radio actors
Estonian male film actors
Estonian male voice actors
Estonian male television actors
20th-century Estonian male actors
University of Tartu alumni
People from Peipsiääre Parish
Burials at Metsakalmistu